Quintessence is the fourth studio album by Norwegian heavy metal band Borknagar. It was recorded at The Abyss Studios in January 2000 and mixed by Peter Tägtgren.

According to the members of the band, this album was initially meant to be a relatively straightforward black metal release, as indicated by the production quality and the emphasis on harsh vocals rather than clean singing.

Vocalist Simen "ICS Vortex" Hestnæs plays bass guitar on the album, following the departure of former bassist Kai K. Lie prior to recording sessions for the album. Original keyboardist Ivar Bjørnson and drummer Eric "Grim" Brødreskift were also replaced by Lars A. Nedland and Asgeir Mickelson respectively. Quintessence would also be the last Borknagar album to feature Hestnæs, who left to join Dimmu Borgir (reportedly due to an ultimatum on Øystein Brun's part), until his return in 2010.

Track listing

Personnel

Borknagar
Simen Hestnæs (credited as "ICS Vortex") – vocals, bass guitar
Øystein G. Brun – electric guitar
Jens F. Ryland – guitar
Lars A. Nedland – keyboards
Asgeir Mickelson – drums, percussion

Production
Borknagar - production, arrangements
Peter Tagtgren - production, mixing, engineer
Lars Szoke - engineer
Tom Kvallsvoll - mastering
Christophe Szpajdel – logo

References

External links
Borknagar-Quintessence (2000 4th Album at Borknagar.com)

Borknagar albums
2000 albums
Century Media Records albums
Albums produced by Peter Tägtgren